Sergei Iosifovich Shaposhnikov (8 March 1923 – 22 June 2021) was a Russian football player and coach.

Shaposhnikov was born in Petrograd, and died on 22 June 2021 at the age of 98.

References

External links
 

1923 births
2021 deaths
Soviet footballers
Footballers from Saint Petersburg
Association football forwards
FC SKA-Khabarovsk players
PFC CSKA Moscow players
Soviet football managers
SC Odesa managers
SKA Lviv managers
PFC CSKA Moscow managers
FC Chornomorets Odesa managers
FC Zimbru Chișinău managers
FC Kairat managers
SC Tavriya Simferopol managers
Recipients of the Medal of the Order "For Merit to the Fatherland" II class
Merited Coaches of the Soviet Union
Soviet people of World War II